Juan Bueno (born 10 October 1957) is a Cuban rower. He competed in two events at the 1980 Summer Olympics.

References

1957 births
Living people
Cuban male rowers
Olympic rowers of Cuba
Rowers at the 1980 Summer Olympics
Place of birth missing (living people)